Terron is a given name. Notable people with the given name include:

Terron Armstead (born 1991), American football offensive tackle
Terron Brooks (born 1974), American singer, songwriter, and actor
Terron Millett (born 1968), American boxer
Terron Schaefer, Brazilian businessman
Terron Ward (born 1992), American football running back

See also
Terrón, surname